Johnny Boy is the 2006 debut album by British indie pop duo Johnny Boy. It contains their previously released singles "You Are the Generation That Bought More Shoes and You Get What You Deserve" and "Johnny Boy Theme," which were extremely well received by critics despite limited distribution.

The album was co-produced by James Dean Bradfield of Manic Street Preachers.

Critical response
NME gave the album 5/10, finding nothing lived up to their debut single. Pitchfork agreed, giving it 5.2/10; they also criticised the limited range of singer Lolly.

Track listing
"You Are the Generation That Bought More Shoes and You Get What You Deserve"
"Wall Street"
"Fifteen Minutes"
"Livin' in the City"
"War on Want"
"Springer"
"All Exits Final"
"Formaldehyde (Last Words of Lottery Loser)"
"Bonnie Parker's 115th Dream"
"Johnny Boy Theme"

References

2006 albums
Albums produced by Dave Eringa